The Peräpohjola dialects are forms of Finnish spoken in Lapland in Finland, Sweden, and Norway. The dialect group belongs to the Western Finnish dialects and it is divided into five more specific dialect groups.

Features 
Like the Northern Ostrobothnian (Oulu) dialects, Peräpohjola dialects are Western dialects that show features from Eastern dialects. For instance the reflex to standard -ts- in metsä is mettä according to a Western pattern, whereas the reflex of standard -d- is deletion, 'j', or 'v', as in Eastern dialects, e.g. vedän - vejän. Epenthetic vowels (tyhjä - tyhyjä) are not common although found in southern Tornio dialects. There are no vowel or diphthong changes, a Western/standard feature, but there is a general gemination of consonants in short initial syllables (e.g. standard makaa is ), as in Oulu and Eastern dialects. Palatalization is absent, which is a very Western feature, since palatalization occurs even in the (Western) Oulu dialect.

A unique feature is that unstressed syllables in e.g. the illative case are preceded with an emphatic 'h', e.g. talhon vs. standard taloon, menhään vs. standard mennään. This is highly distinctive but very difficult for outsiders to imitate correctly. Also, the reflex to the standard third-person verb suffix -vat ("they") is a simple -t, e.g. annoit vs antoivat.

Dialects

Tornio dialects
Tornio dialects are spoken in the area surrounding Torne River in Finnish Peräpohjola (North Bothnia) and on the Swedish side of the river (Norrbotten). In Finland Tornio dialects are spoken in the municipalities of Enontekiö, Kolari, Muonio, Pello and Ylitornio. In Sweden the dialect is spoken in Hedenäset, Jukkasjärvi, Junosuando, Karesuando, Karungi, Korpilombolo, Pajala, Tärendö, Vittangi and Övertorneå.

In Sweden the Tornio dialects together with Gällivare dialects are also called meänkieli. It has an official minority language status. It has many Swedish loanwords, and partly a different spelling compared to Finnish, because of a different standardization organisation.

Kemi dialects
Kemi dialects are spoken in Finland in the municipalities of Inari, Kemi, Kittilä, Rovaniemi, Simo, Sodankylä, Tervola and Utsjoki.

Kemijärvi dialects
Kemijärvi dialects are spoken in Kemijärvi, Pelkosenniemi, Salla and Savukoski.

Gällivare dialects
Gällivare dialects are spoken in Sweden in Gällivare and some surrounding villages. Finnish language has been a common language spoken at home in the area but the dialects differ quite much from those spoken on the Finnish side of the border.

Together with the Tornio dialects the Gällivare dialects are called meänkieli in Sweden. Meänkieli has an official minority language status in some municipalities in northern Sweden

Ruija dialects
Ruija dialects are spoken in Northern Norway in Alta, Lyngen, Lakselv, Kvænangen, Nordreisa and Vadsø. This form of speech is called Kven language in Norway for political and historical reasons.

See also
 Peräpohjola

References

Finnish dialects